Miss Universe 2007 was the 56th Miss Universe pageant, held at the Auditorio Nacional in Mexico City, Mexico on May 28, 2007. 

At the end of the event, Zuleyka Rivera of Puerto Rico crowned Riyo Mori from Japan as Miss Universe 2007. It is Japan's first victory in 48 years, and the second victory of the country in the pageant's history.

Contestants from 77 countries and territories competed in this year's pageant. The competition was hosted by Mario Lopez and Vanessa Minnillo, Miss Teen USA 1998. Mexican Latin pop group RBD performed in this year's pageant.

Background

Location and date 
On February 11, 2007, Pedro Rodríguez, president of the Grupo Promotor Mu México announced that the cities of Cancún and Oaxaca will host the 2007 edition of the pageant in May. However, on March 30, 2007, Donald Trump, owner of the Miss Universe Organization, and Paula Shugart, president of the Miss Universe Organization, announced that the pageant will take place at the Auditorio Nacional in Mexico City on May 28, 2007. Oaxaca had to reject from being one of the host cities for some pageant events due to the political-social conflict happening at the state. The ruins of Monte Albán in Oaxaca was planned to be the location for the national costume competition, but was relocated to the Angel of Independence in Mexico City.

Selection of participants 
Contestants from 77 countries and territories were selected to compete in the competition. Two of these delegates were appointees to their positions after being a runner-up of their national pageant or being selected through a casting process, while two selected to replace the original dethroned winner.

Sharon Kenett was appointed to represent Israel at Miss Universe after Liran Kohener, Miss Israel 2007, had to complete her mandatory military service. Miss Mauritius 2006 Melody Selvon was replaced by Sandra Faro, the first runner-up of Miss Mauritius 2006, due to being underage. Selvon was only 16 years old.

The 2007 edition saw the debuts of Tanzania, Serbia and Montenegro as two separate nations, and the returns of Barbados, Belize, Curaçao, Honduras, and Italy. Honduras last competed in 2002, while the others last competed in 2005. The Cayman Islands, Chile, Ethiopia, Ghana, Iceland, Ireland, Latvia, Namibia, the Northern Mariana Islands, Saint Vincent and the Grenadines, Serbia and Montenegro, Sint Maarten, Sri Lanka, Sweden, Trinidad and Tobago, Turkey, and the United Kingdom withdrew. Serbia and Montenegro competed as two separate countries starting in this edition. Aruni Rajapaksha of Sri Lanka withdrew due to undisclosed reasons. However, Rajapaksha competed in the pageant the following year. Casynella Olivierre of the Saint Vincent and the Grenadines withdrew for unknown reasons despite announcing that she will compete in Miss Universe 2007 two years in advance. Lestapier Winqvist of Sweden withdrew after not showing up for the pageant since she finds the competition "misogynistic". The Cayman Islands, Chile, Ethiopia, Ghana, Iceland, Ireland, Latvia, Namibia, the Northern Mariana Islands, Sint Maarten, Trinidad and Tobago, Turkey, and the United Kingdom withdrew after their respective organizations failed to hold a national competition or appoint a delegate.

Incidents before the pageant 
In April 2007, controversy erupted over the proposed national costume of Rosa María Ojeda, Miss Mexico. The skirt of the costume depicted scenes from the Cristero War, a Roman Catholic rebellion in the 1920s in which thousands of people were killed, including hangings. The outfit also included a bullet-studded belt and a crucifix necklace. The design was chosen from over thirty others and had been intended to show Mexico's culture and history, but it elicited controversy amid claims it was in poor taste and inappropriate. Pageant owners said that the costume would be redesigned to include image of the Virgin of Guadalupe.

Results

Placements

Final Scores

Special awards

Pageant

Format
The Miss Universe Organization introduced several specific changes to the format for this edition. The number of semifinalists was reduced to 15— the same number of semifinalists in 2005. 15 semifinalists were chosen through the preliminary competition— composed of the swimsuit and evening gown competitions and closed-door interviews. The top 15 competed in the swimsuit competition and were narrowed down to the top 10 afterward. The top 10 competed in the evening gown competition and were narrowed down to the top 5 afterward. This was the first year since 2002 that the judges' average scores were shown on television. The top 5 competed in the question and answer round and the final look. It was the first time since 2001 that the final question posed on the ladies came from the judges instead of the final five and the current Miss Universe.

Selection committee

Final telecast 
 Tony Romo – Dallas Cowboys quarterback
 James Kyson Lee – actor on Heroes
 Nina Garcia – Project Runway judge and Elle magazine fashion director
 Dave Navarro – rock star
 Dayanara Torres – Miss Universe 1993 from Puerto Rico
 Mauricio Islas – Mexican actor
 Lindsay Clubine – Deal or No Deal briefcase model
 Marc Bouwer – fashion designer
 Christiane Martel – Miss Universe 1953 from France
 Michelle Kwan – World champion, 1998 Olympic silver medalist, and 2002 Olympic figure skating bronze medalist

Contestants 
77 contestants competed for the title.

Notes

References

External links

 Miss Universe official website

2007
2007 in Mexico
2007 beauty pageants
Beauty pageants in Mexico
Events in Mexico City
May 2007 events in Mexico